Renssalaer is a masculine given name. Notable people with the name include:

Renssalaer William Foote (1815–1862), American army officer
Thomas Van Renssalaer Gibbs (1855–1898), African American politician

See also
Rensselaer (disambiguation)

English-language masculine given names
English masculine given names
English-language surnames